The following is a list of notable deaths in July 2018.

Entries for each day are listed alphabetically by surname. A typical entry lists information in the following sequence:
 Name, age, country of citizenship at birth, subsequent country of citizenship (if applicable), reason for notability, cause of death (if known), and reference.

July 2018

1
Armando, 88, Dutch artist.
Bruce Baker, 72, American geneticist.
Amos Cardarelli, 86, Italian footballer (Roma, Internazionale, national team).
Roy Carr, 73, British music journalist (NME, Vox).
François Corbier, 73, French songwriter and television presenter, cancer.
Bozhidar Dimitrov, 72, Bulgarian historian, heart attack.
Brad Dye, 84, American politician, Lieutenant Governor of Mississippi (1980–1992).
Ayanna Dyette, 32, Trinidadian volleyball player, cervical cancer.
Dick Feagler, 79, American journalist (The Plain Dealer), playwright, and television personality (WKYC, WEWS).
Peter Firmin, 89, British television producer (Bagpuss, Noggin the Nog, Clangers).
Harvey Gentry, 92, American baseball player (New York Giants).
Gordon Hillman, 74, British archaeobotanist.
Shirley Huffman, 89, American politician, Mayor of Hillsboro, Oregon (1985–1993).
Dame Gillian Lynne, 92, British dancer and choreographer (The Phantom of the Opera, Cats, The Muppet Show), pneumonia.
Anacleto Sima Ngua, 82, Equatorial Guinean Roman Catholic prelate, Bishop of Bata (1982–2002).
Gianfranco Petris, 81, Italian footballer (Fiorentina, Lazio, national team).
Awtar Singh, 52, Afghan politician, loya jirga representative for Paktia, bombing.
Leo Thiffault, 73, Canadian ice hockey player (Minnesota North Stars).
Terence Thomas, Baron Thomas of Macclesfield, 80, British banker and politician.
Julian Tudor Hart, 91, British physician and writer.

2
Henry Butler, 68, American jazz pianist, cancer.
Emma Černá, 81, Czech actress (Adelheid, Day for My Love, Viy).
Sutanto Djuhar, 90, Chinese-Indonesian entrepreneur, co-founder of the Salim Group, Indofood and Indocement.
Richard S. Ellis, 71, American mathematician, bile duct cancer.
Patrick Finnegan, 68, American Army General and lawyer, President of Longwood University (2010–2012), heart attack.
Henri Froment-Meurice, 95, French diplomat, Ambassador to the Soviet Union (1979–1981) and West Germany (1981–1983).
Antonio Halili, 72, Filipino politician, Mayor of Tanauan City (since 2013), shot.
Shih-Ying Lee, 100, Chinese-born American engineer and inventor.
Maurice Lemaître, 92, French artist.
Liu Boli, 87, Chinese nuclear chemist, academician of the Chinese Academy of Engineering.
Alan Longmuir, 70, Scottish bass guitarist (Bay City Rollers).
Denis Mitchison, 98, British bacteriologist.
Jayant Ganpat Nadkarni, 86, Indian Navy admiral, Chief of the Naval Staff (1987–1990).
Ángel Roberto Seifart, 76, Paraguayan judge and politician, Vice President (1993–1998).
Shuhaimi Shafiei, 50, Malaysian politician, cancer.
Meic Stephens, 79, Welsh writer and editor.
Gavin Trippe, 78, British motorcycle racing promoter and publisher.
Katsura Utamaru, 81, Japanese rakugo storyteller, pulmonary disease.
Bill Watrous, 79, American jazz trombonist.

3
Pierre-Ernest Abandzounou, 77–78, Congolese politician, stroke.
Alan Diaz, 71, American photographer, Pulitzer Prize winner (2001).
Richard Erdall, 85, American politician.
Halima Khatun, 84, Bangladeshi academic, writer and activist.
Thérèse Kleindienst, 101, French librarian.
Krishna Kumari, 92, Indian royal, politician and philanthropist, last Maharani of Jodhpur, member of the Lok Sabha (1971–1977).
Henri Martre, 90, French telecommunications engineer.
Barthélemy Mukenge, 92, Congolese politician, President of Kasaï (1960–1962, 1962).
Robby Müller, 78, Dutch cinematographer (Paris, Texas, Dancer in the Dark, Dead Man), vascular dementia.
Boris Orlov, 73, Russian gymnastics coach.
Lorraine Rodgers, 97, American WASP pilot.
Takahiro Satō, 41, Japanese manga writer, acute coronary syndrome.
Bradford A. Smith, 86, American astronomer, complications of myasthenia gravis.
Arthur Stinchcombe, 85, American sociologist.
Richard Swift, 41, American singer-songwriter, producer and musician (The Shins, The Black Keys, Starflyer 59), complications from hepatitis.
Guilherme Uchoa, 71, Brazilian politician, President of the Legislative Assembly of Pernambuco, pulmonary edema.
Dave VanDam, 63, American voice actor and impressionist (David Letterman, Barack Obama), member of the Wack Pack.
Wang Jian, 56, Chinese businessman, co-founder of Hainan Airlines and HNA Group, fall.

4
Boukary Adji, 79, Nigerien politician, Prime Minister (1996).
E. Riley Anderson, 85, American judge, Chief Justice of the Tennessee Supreme Court (1994–1996, 1997–1998, 1998–2001).
Carmen Campagne, 58, Canadian singer and children's entertainer, Juno winner (1989), cancer.
Georges-Emmanuel Clancier, 104, French poet and novelist.
Ernst W. Hamburger, 85, Brazilian physicist, lymphoma.
Rogelio Mangahas, 79, Filipino poet and writer.
Harry M. Miller, 84, New Zealand-born Australian promoter, publicist and talent agent.
Ali Qanso, 70, Lebanese politician, cancer.
Alan S. Rabson, 92, American pathologist and cancer researcher.
Donovan Webster, 59, American journalist.

5
François Budet, 78, French singer-songwriter, novelist, and poet.
Adamu Ciroma, 83, Nigerian politician and banker, Minister of Finance (1999–2003).
Donald J. Farish, 75, American educator, President of Roger Williams University (since 2011).
Evgeny Golod, 83, Russian mathematician.
Skënder Hyka, 73, Albanian footballer (17 Nëntori, national team).
Claude Lanzmann, 92, French documentarian (Shoah, The Last of the Unjust, Pourquoi Israël).
Jim Malloy, 87, American recording engineer (Elvis Presley, Johnny Cash, Henry Mancini), Grammy winner (1964).
Gerald Messadié, 87, French author.
Ed Schultz, 64, American broadcaster (The Ed Show, The Ed Schultz Show) and political commentator.
Kenneth Shearwood, 96, English cricketer.
Michel Suffran, 87, French novelist.
Jean-Louis Tauran, 75, French Roman Catholic cardinal, President of the PCID (since 2007) and Camerlengo of the Holy Roman Church (since 2014), Parkinson's disease.
Hubert Zafke, 97, German military officer.

6
Omran al-Zoubi, 58, Syrian politician.
Donald D. Belcher, 79, American executive, CEO of Banta Corporation.
Eugène Bellemare, 86, Canadian politician, MP for Carleton-Gloucester (1988–2004).
Gilbert Facchinetti, 82, Swiss football executive, President of Neuchâtel Xamax (1979–2005).
Jeremy Gold, 75, American actuary and economist.
J. Frederick Grassle, 78, American marine biologist.
Bruce Hunter, 79, American Olympic swimmer (1960).
Vlatko Ilievski, 33, Macedonian pop singer and actor.
Kimishige Ishizaka, 92, Japanese immunologist, discovered the antibody class IgE, heart failure.
Ron Lollar, 69, American politician, member of the Tennessee House of Representatives (since 2006), heart attack.
Bruce Maher, 80, American football player, (Detroit Lions, New York Giants), cancer.
Vince Martin, 81, American folk singer ("Cindy, Oh Cindy"), pulmonary fibrosis.
Clifford Rozier, 45, American basketball player (Golden State Warriors, Toronto Raptors, Minnesota Timberwolves), heart attack.
Antonio Toledo Corro, 99, Mexican politician, Governor of Sinaloa (1981–1986), cerebral infarction.
Amritlal Vegad, 89, Indian author.
Japanese convicted murderers from the Aum Shinrikyo cult, executed by hanging.
Shoko Asahara, 63, leader.
Seiichi Endo, 58.
Kiyohide Hayakawa, 68.
Yoshihiro Inoue, 48.
Tomomitsu Niimi, 54.
Masami Tsuchiya, 53.

7
Feliciano Amaral, 97, Brazilian pastor and evangelical singer.
Alexander Bogomolny, 54, Israeli-American mathematician.
Ralph T. Browning, 76, American Air Force pilot.
John Dunlop, 78, British racehorse trainer.
William Dunlop, 32, Northern Irish motorcycle racer, collision during practice.
Paul Fetler, 98, American composer.
John R. Harris, 84, American economist.
Bret Hoffmann, 51, American death metal singer (Malevolent Creation), colorectal cancer.
Tyler Honeycutt, 27, American basketball player (UCLA, Sacramento Kings), suicide by gunshot.
Alan Johnson, 81, American choreographer (The Producers, Young Frankenstein), Emmy winner (1972, 1980, 1988), Parkinson's disease.
Hacène Lalmas, 75, Algerian footballer.
Levko Lukyanenko, 89, Ukrainian political Soviet-era dissident and politician, Deputy (1990–1992, 1995–1998, 2002–2007) and author of the Declaration of Independence of Ukraine.
Prince Michel of Bourbon-Parma, 92, French royal, soldier and race car driver.
Firuz Mustafayev, 84, Azerbaijani politician, Prime Minister (1992).
Masayuki Nagare, 95, Japanese sculptor.
Luigi Ossola, 80, Italian footballer (Varese, Roma).
Grant Reuber, 91, Canadian economist.
Rani Sarker, 86, Bangladeshi film actress (Devdas).
Peter Sawyer, 90, British historian.
Sir Maurice Shock, 92, British educationalist and university administrator, Vice-Chancellor of the University of Leicester (1977–1987).
Tessa Tennant, 59, British green investment campaigner, cancer.
Terry Todd, 80, American weightlifter and sports historian.

8
Pema Browne, 90, American abstract artist. 
Tom Gallagher, 77, American diplomat.
Alan Gilzean, 79, Scottish footballer (Dundee, Tottenham Hotspur, national team), brain tumour.
Tab Hunter, 86, American actor (Damn Yankees, Grease 2) and singer ("Young Love"), blood clot.
M. M. Jacob, 90, Indian politician, Governor of Meghalaya (1995–2007).
Sumit Kalia, 30, Indian cricketer.
Tazir Kariyev, 29, Russian footballer (FC Angusht Nazran), shot.
Anthony Kirk-Greene, 93, British historian.
Billy Knight, 39, American basketball player (UCLA Bruins), suicide by self-inflicted blunt force trauma.
Oliver Knussen, 66, British composer.
Liu Tonghua, 88, Chinese pathologist, academician of the Chinese Academy of Engineering.
Barry Mills, 70, American white supremacist and criminal, leader of the Aryan Brotherhood.
Piratita Morgan, 49, Mexican professional wrestler.
Flora Plumb, 73, American actress.
Frank Ramsey, 86, American Hall of Fame basketball player (Boston Celtics).
Robert D. Ray, 89, American politician, Governor of Iowa (1969–1983), Mayor of Des Moines (1997), and President of Drake University (1998), Parkinson's disease.
Saleem Shahzad, 62, Pakistani politician, MNA (1988–1992), lung cancer.
Lonnie Shelton, 62, American basketball player (New York Knicks, Seattle SuperSonics, Cleveland Cavaliers), hypertension.
Carlo Vanzina, 67, Italian film director (Nothing Underneath, Vacanze di Natale, Un'estate al mare), producer and screenwriter, melanoma.
Priyani Jayasinghe, 51, Sri Lankan singer, stabbing using scissors.

9
Kavi Kumar Azad, 45, Indian actor (Taarak Mehta Ka Ooltah Chashmah), heart attack.
Barbara Carlson, 80, American politician and radio host (KSTP), Minneapolis City Councilor (1981–1989), lung cancer.
Peter Carington, 6th Baron Carrington, 99, British politician, Foreign Secretary (1979–1982), Secretary General of NATO (1984–1988).
Sam Chisholm, 78, New Zealand-born Australian television executive (Nine Network, Sky UK).
Stefan Demert, 78, Swedish musician.
Sammy Esposito, 86, American baseball player (Chicago White Sox, Kansas City Athletics).
Dominique Frélaut, 90, French politician, Deputy (1973–1986, 2001–2002), mayor of Colombes (1965–2001).
William Hughes, 20, British amateur boxer (Queen Mary University of London) and child actor (Doctor Who), British 42 kg schoolboy champion (2011), BUCS champion (2018), suicide.
Melanie Kaye/Kantrowitz, 73, American poet and activist, Parkinson's disease.
Johnny Moates, 73, American college basketball player (Richmond Spiders).
Irmgard Oepen, 89, German physician.
Jenny Phillips, 76, American documentarian (The Dhamma Brothers) and therapist, drowned.
Hans-Pavia Rosing, 70, Greenlandic politician.
Finnbjörn Þorvaldsson, 94, Icelandic Olympic sprinter (1948), handball player and basketball player (Íþróttafélag Reykjavíkur).
Michel Tromont, 81, Belgian politician, Deputy (1978–1983), Governor of Hainaut (1983–2004), Mayor of Quiévrain (1977–1983).
Hans Günter Winkler, 91, German Hall of Fame show jumping rider, Olympic champion (1956).
Marion Woodman, 89, Canadian author and psychologist.
Queen Worlu, 58, Nigerian diplomat, Ambassador to São Tomé and Príncipe (since 2017).

10
Kebede Balcha, 66, Ethiopian marathon runner, world championship silver medalist (1983).
Robert Behringer, 69, American physicist.
Alicia Bellán, 86, Argentine actress.
Carlo Benetton, 74, Italian fashion executive, co-founder of Benetton Group, cancer.
Haroon Bilour, 48, Pakistani politician, bombing.
Mikalay Dzyemyantsyey, 88, Belarusian politician, Chairman of the Supreme Soviet of Belarus (1990–1991).
William Hobbs, 79, British fencer and fight choreographer (Willow, Flash Gordon, Rob Roy), dementia.
Edvin Hodžić, 23, Austrian footballer.
Hu Sheng-cheng, 77, Taiwanese economist, pulmonary calcification.
Ron Johnson, 62, American football player (Pittsburgh Steelers).
Clive King, 94, English author (Stig of the Dump).
John Laird, Baron Laird, 74, British politician, member of the House of Lords (since 1999).
Jessica Mann, 80, British writer.
Henry Morgenthau III, 101, American author and television producer.
Jan Henry T. Olsen, 61, Norwegian politician, Minister of Fisheries (1992–1996), Alzheimer's disease.
Marlene Riding In Mameah, 85, American silversmith.
Darryl Rogers, 83, American football coach (Michigan State Spartans, Arizona State Sun Devils, Detroit Lions).
Karl Schmidt, 86, German footballer.
Mien Schopman-Klaver, 107, Dutch Olympic athlete (1932).
José María Setién, 90, Spanish Roman Catholic prelate, Bishop of San Sebastián (1979–2000), stroke.
John A. Stormer, 90, American author.
Andrei Suslin, 67, Russian mathematician, Cole Prize winner (2000).
Tin Ka Ping, 98, Hong Kong entrepreneur and philanthropist.
Ladislav Toman, 83, Czech volleyball player, Olympic silver medalist (1964).
Ye Lwin, 70, Burmese guitarist and peace activist, liver cancer.

11
Abdel Aziem Al-Afifi, 48, Egyptian-born Australian Islamic cleric and scholar, Grand Mufti of Australia (since 2018), cancer.
Paco Costas, 86, Spanish automotive and road safety journalist (Televisión Española).
Richard John Garcia, 71, American Roman Catholic prelate, Bishop of Monterey, California (since 2007), Alzheimer's disease.
Mario Gargano, 89, Italian politician, Deputy (1972–1983).
Václav Glazar, 65, Czech actor, heart failure.
Barbara Harrell-Bond, 86, American-born British refugee studies academic (University of Oxford).
Abdelkhader Houamel, 81, Algerian painter.
Augusto Ibáñez Guzmán, 60, Colombian lawyer, magistrate and academic, President of Supreme Court of Justice (2009–2012), cancer.
Ji Chunhua, 56, Chinese actor and action choreographer.
Mahendra Kaul, 95, Indian-born British television presenter.
Laurie Kelly, 89, Australian politician, NSW MP for Corrimal (1968–1988), Speaker (1976–1988), pneumonia.
Liu Zhenhua, 97, Chinese general and diplomat, ambassador to Albania (1971–1976).
Rodolfo Lozano, 76, American judge (U.S. District Court for the Northern District of Indiana).
Giovanni Marra, 87, Italian Roman Catholic prelate, Archbishop of Messina-Lipari-Santa Lucia del Mela (1997–2006).
Vojtěch Mynář, 74, Czech politician, MEP (2012–2014).
Tom Neil, 97, British fighter pilot (Battle of Britain), member of The Few.
Nathaniel Reed, 84, American environmentalist and political aide (Claude R. Kirk Jr.), co-writer of the Endangered Species Act of 1973, head injury from fall.
Lindy Remigino, 87, American sprinter, Olympic champion (1952), pancreatic cancer.
Mai Tai Sing, 94, American actress (Forbidden, Strange Portrait).
Pat Swindall, 67, American politician, member of the U.S. House of Representatives from Georgia's 4th district (1985–1989).
Wu Bing'an, 89, Chinese ethnologist, cancer.

12
Abbas Amir-Entezam, 86, Iranian politician and convicted spy, Deputy Prime Minister (1979).
J. A. Bailey, 88, English cricket player and administrator, Secretary of Marylebone Cricket Club (1974–1987). 
Angela Bowen, 82, American academic and dance teacher.
Len Chappell, 77, American basketball player (Philadelphia 76ers, New York Knicks, Milwaukee Bucks).
Thomas F. Ellis, 97, American lawyer and political strategist (National Congressional Club).
Alain Fauré, 55, French politician, Deputy (2012–2017), Mayor of Les Pujols (2001–2014).
Xerardo Fernández Albor, 100, Spanish politician, President of Galicia (1982–1987).
Ange-Marie Filippi-Codaccioni, French historian and politician.
Bud Lathrop, 82, American basketball coach (Raytown South High School).
Dora Luz, 100, Mexican singer.
Dimitar Marashliev, 70, Bulgarian footballer (CSKA Sofia, national team).
Joseph Henry Mensah, 89, Ghanaian politician and economist, MP (1969–1972, 1997–2009).
Mauno Nurmi, 81, Finnish football and ice hockey player.
Roger Perry, 85, American actor (Falcon Crest, Harrigan and Son, Arrest and Trial), prostate cancer.
Del Shankel, 90, American microbiologist and academic administrator, Chancellor of University of Kansas (1980–1981, 1994–1995).
Laura Soveral, 85, Angolan-born Portuguese actress.
Joan Stafford-King-Harman, 100, British socialite and intelligence officer.
Thomas Stephens, 82, American football player (Boston Patriots).
Dada Vaswani, 99, Indian spiritual leader.
José Omar Verdún, 73, Uruguayan footballer (Peñarol, Club Olimpia, Real Cartagena).
Robert Wolders, 81, Dutch actor (Laredo).
Fred van der Zwan, 82, Dutch Olympic water polo player (1960).

13
Ponty Bone, 78, American accordionist, progressive supranuclear palsy.
Peter Copeman, 86, English dermatologist.
Grahame Dangerfield, 80, British broadcaster and naturalist.
Stan Dragoti, 85, American film director (Mr. Mom, Necessary Roughness, Love at First Bite), complications from pneumonia.
Ray Frenette, 83, Canadian politician, Premier of New Brunswick (1997–1998).
Frank Giroud, 62, French comics writer.
Naturalism, 29, New Zealand-born Australian racehorse.
Atukwei Okai, 77, Ghanaian poet and academic (University of Ghana).
Claudio Pieri, 77, Italian football referee.
Siraj Raisani, 55, Pakistani politician, bombing.
K. Rani, 75, Indian playback singer.
Luc Rosenzweig, 74, French journalist and writer.
Claude Seignolle, 101, French author.
Thorvald Stoltenberg, 87, Norwegian politician, Minister of Defence (1979–1981), Minister of Foreign Affairs (1987–1989, 1990–1993).
Jocelyn Vollmar, 92, American ballerina.

14
Anthony Caesar, 94, English priest and composer.
Mario Casalinuovo, 96, Italian politician, Deputy (1979–1987), Minister of Transports (1982–1983).
Gordon Chong, 74, Canadian politician, Toronto City Councilor (1980–1982), Chairman of the Greater Toronto Services Board (2001).
Harold Covington, 64, American political activist.
Christa Dichgans, 78, German painter.
Sir Alan Donald, 87, British diplomat, Ambassador to China (1988–1991), prostate cancer.
Claudia Griffith, 67, American politician, member of the Oklahoma House of Representatives (since 2015), heart attack.
Theo-Ben Gurirab, 80, Namibian politician, Prime Minister (2002–2005), President of the UN General Assembly (1999–2000), Speaker of the National Assembly (2005–2015).
Vidmantė Jasukaitytė, 70, Lithuanian writer.
Hans Kronberger, 67, Austrian politician.
Mick Langley, British snooker player, Paralympic champion (1988).
Davie McParland, 83, Scottish football player and manager (Partick Thistle, Queen's Park, Hamilton).
Chet Morgan, 81, American politician, member of the Connecticut House of Representatives (1977–1983).
Pio Rapagnà, 73, Italian politician, Deputy (1992–1994), respiratory failure.
Masa Saito, 76, Japanese professional wrestler (NWA, NJPW, WWF), Parkinson's disease.
Thomas Stevens, 79, American trumpeter.
Natalia Tanner, 96, American physician.
Ron Thomas, 67, American basketball player (Louisville Cardinals, Kentucky Colonels).
Juan María Uribezubia, 78, Spanish cyclist.
Petr Weigl, 79, Czech director, playwright and dramaturge.

15
Ronny Fredrik Ansnes, 29, Norwegian cross-country skier, drowned.
Maj-Britt Bæhrendtz, 102, Swedish writer and radio host.
Trevor Brewer, 87, Welsh rugby union player (Newport, London Welsh, national team).
Olav Bucher-Johannessen, 91, Norwegian diplomat and politician.
Dave Dave, 42, American conceptual artist, subject of David.
Theryl DeClouet, 66, American jazz-funk singer (Galactic).
Ray Emery, 35, Canadian ice hockey player (Ottawa Senators, Philadelphia Flyers, Chicago Blackhawks), drowned.
Roman Korynt, 88, Polish footballer.
Stan Lewis, 91, American record label owner (Jewel Records).
Dragutin Šurbek, 71, Croatian Olympic table tennis player (1992), world champion (1979, 1983).

16
Václav Burda, 45, Czech ice hockey player (national team) and scout (Ottawa Senators, Edmonton Oilers), world championship bronze medalist (1998), traffic collision.
Gabriel Caruana, 89, Maltese artist.
Chow Kwai Lam, 75, Malaysian football player and manager (national team).
Francis Farley, 97, British scientist.
Bo Grahn, 70, Finnish Olympic shot putter (1972), melanoma.
Jaime Guardia, 85, Peruvian charango player, composer and musicologist.
Robin Jones, 64, American basketball player (Portland Trail Blazers, Houston Rockets, Olympique Antibes).
Madeleine Kamman, 87, French chef and restaurateur.
Marija Kohn, 83, Croatian actress.
Christian Menn, 91, Swiss bridge architect.
Jerzy Piskun, 80, Polish Olympic basketball player (1960, 1964).
Gabriel Rivera, 57, American football player (Pittsburgh Steelers, Texas Tech Red Raiders).
Evan Whitton, 90, Australian journalist (The Sydney Morning Herald), five-time Walkley Award winner.
Manuel Ycaza, 80, Panamanian-born American jockey, Belmont Stakes winner (1964 with Quadrangle), pneumonia and sepsis.

17
Arthur James Armstrong, 93, American Methodist bishop.
Gary Beach, 70, American actor (The Producers, Beauty and the Beast, La Cage aux Folles), Tony winner (2001).
Rita Bhaduri, 62, Indian actress.
Yvonne Blake, 78, British-born Spanish costume designer (Superman, Nicholas and Alexandra, Jesus Christ Superstar), Oscar winner (1971), complications from a stroke.
Lincoln Brower, 86, American entomologist (monarch butterfly) and academic.
Murabit al-Hajj, 105, Mauritanian Islamic cleric and scholar.
Mark Hayes, 69, American golfer, Alzheimer's disease.
Honour and Glory, 25, American racehorse, complications from a broken femur.
Bullumba Landestoy, 93, Dominican pianist and composer.
Saait Magiet, 66, South African cricketer.
Radoslav Nenadál, 88, Czech writer and English-language translator (Sophie's Choice).
John Ovenden, 75, British politician, MP for Gravesend (1974–1979).
Nancy M. Petry, 49, American psychologist, breast cancer.
Kim Renders, 63, Canadian writer, director and actress.
João Semedo, 67, Portuguese pulmonologist and politician, member of Assembly of Republic (2006–2015).
David Stevens, 77, Palestinian-born Australian playwright (The Sum of Us) and screenwriter (Breaker Morant), cancer.
Langton Tinago, 68, Zimbabwean boxer, dual Commonwealth lightweight champion (1980–1981, 1986–1987), Commonwealth super featherweight champion (1983–1984).
Robert H. Traurig, 93, American lawyer, founder of Greenberg Traurig.
Hugh Whitemore, 82, English playwright and screenwriter (The Gathering Storm, 84 Charing Cross Road, The Final Days).
Yang Kuo-shu, 86, Taiwanese psychologist and activist, member of Academia Sinica, stroke.

18
Carlos Aldunate Lyon, 102, Chilean Jesuit priest, master of novices (Pope Francis) and writer.
Anne Olivier Bell, 102, English literary editor and art scholar, member of the Monuments Men Brigade.
Adrian Cronauer, 79, American disc jockey (AFN), subject of Good Morning, Vietnam.
John Banks Elliott, 101, Ghanaian diplomat, Ambassador to Soviet Union (1960–1966).
Ronald H. Griffith, 82, American military officer, Vice Chief of Staff of the United States Army (1995–1997), heart attack.
Aiko Herzig-Yoshinaga, 92, American political activist.
A. I. Katsina-Alu, 76, Nigerian judge, Chief Justice (2009–2011).
Ling Li, 76, Chinese historical novelist and missile engineering technologist.
Czesław Malec, 77, Polish Olympic basketball player (1968).
Mo Nunn, 79, English motor racing team owner (Ensign Racing).
Pedro Pérez, 66, Cuban Olympic triple jumper (1972, 1976), Pan-American champion (1971).
Burton Richter, 87, American physicist, Nobel Prize laureate (1976).
Larry Robinson, 76, Canadian Hall of Fame football player (Calgary Stampeders).
Mollie Tibbetts, 20, American student (University of Iowa), multiple sharp force injuries.
Rob van Mesdag, 88, Dutch Olympic rower (1952), European championship bronze medalist (1955).
Geoffrey Wellum, 96, British fighter pilot (Battle of Britain), member of The Few.

19
Jennifer Cassar, 66, Trinidadian indigenous leader (Santa Rosa First Peoples Community) and civil servant, Carib Queen (since 2011), complications following surgery.
Ibrahim Coomassie, 76, Nigerian police officer, Inspector General of Police (1993–1999).
Gustavo de Greiff, 89, Colombian lawyer, educator and activist, Attorney General (1992–1994).
Shinobu Hashimoto, 100, Japanese screenwriter (Seven Samurai, Rashomon, I Live in Fear), pneumonia.
Philip Holst-Cappelen, 53, Norwegian fraudster and kidnapper, starvation.
Michael Howells, 61, British production designer (Victoria, Ever After, Nanny McPhee).
Rayo de Jalisco Sr., 85, Mexican professional wrestler (AAA).
Gopaldas Neeraj, 93, Indian poet and writer, lung infection.
Rebecca Posner, 88, British philologist.
Jon Schnepp, 51, American animator, filmmaker and voice actor (Metalocalypse, Space Ghost Coast to Coast, The Death of "Superman Lives"), complications from a stroke.
Denis Ten, 25, Kazakhstani figure skater, Olympic bronze medalist (2014), stabbed.
Yale Udoff, 83, American screenwriter (Bad Timing, Third Degree Burn, Eve of Destruction), cardiac arrest as a result of COPD.
John Vigilante, 33, American ice hockey player (Milwaukee Admirals, Syracuse Crunch, Plymouth Whalers).

20
Derek Bond, 91, English Anglican bishop, Bishop of Bradwell (1976–1993).
Michael Ellis, 77, American politician, member of the Wisconsin State Senate (1983–2015) and State Assembly (1970–1980).
María Dolores Gispert Guart, 84, Spanish voice actress and director of dubbing.
Macario Gómez Quibus, 92, Spanish film poster artist (Psycho, Some Like It Hot, The Ten Commandments).
Jeff Hook, 89, Australian cartoonist and illustrator.
Arvo Jantunen, 89, Finnish basketball player and coach.
Charles Koen, 73, American civil rights activist.
Irini Lambraki, 69, Greek politician, MP (1977–1989) and MEP (1994–1999).
Michael Lapage, 94, British Olympic rower (1948).
Archduchess Maria of Austria, 82, German-born Austrian royal.
Mitsuo Matayoshi, 74, Japanese political activist.
Yasuo Matsushita, 92, Japanese banker, Governor of the Bank of Japan (1994–1998).
Haydn Morgan, 81, Welsh rugby union player (national team).
Martin O'Donoghue, 85, Irish politician, Minister of Economic Planning (1977–1979) and Education (1982), TD (1977–1982).
Thaddeus Radzilowski, 80, American historian and author, co-founder of the Piast Institute.
Meg Randall, 91, American actress (Undercover Maisie, Criss Cross, Ma and Pa Kettle Go to Town).
Akhtar Raza Khan, 75, Indian Sunni Muslim scholar and mufti.
Heinz Schilcher, 71, Austrian football player (Ajax, Paris, national team) and manager.
Peter van Geersdaele, 85, British conservator.
Christoph Westerthaler, 53, Austrian football player (Linz, national team) and manager (SV Horn), heart attack.

21
Allan Ball, 75, English footballer (Queen of the South).
Peter Blake, 69, Scottish actor (Dear John).
Garen Bloch, 39, South African Olympic track cyclist (2000), traffic collision.
Alene Duerk, 98, American Navy admiral, director of the Navy Nurse Corps (1970–1975).
Jonathan Gold, 57, American food critic (Los Angeles Times, LA Weekly, Gourmet), Pulitzer Prize winner (2007), pancreatic cancer.
Pierre Jacob, 65, Canadian politician.
Annie Ali Khan, 38, Pakistani model and journalist, suicide by carbon monoxide inhalation.
Ryu Matsumoto, 67, Japanese politician, Minister of Environment (2010–2011), lung cancer.
Don McCarthy, 63, British entrepreneur and philanthropist, chairman of House of Fraser (2006–2014), cancer.
William McCrary, 88, American baseball player (Kansas City Monarchs).
Joseph Oyanga, 82, Ugandan Roman Catholic prelate, Bishop of Lira (1989–2003).
Don Sanders, 73, American singer-songwriter.
Chris Svensson, 53, English-born American auto engineer, re-designer of Ford GT, brain cancer.
Stavros Tsakurakis, 67, Greek jurist and academic (Columbia University, Harvard University, National and Kapodistrian University of Athens), cancer.
Elmarie Wendel, 89, American actress (3rd Rock from the Sun, The Lorax, George Lopez) and singer.
Jacques Wirtz, 93, Belgian landscape gardener.

22
István Ács, 89, Hungarian politician, Chairman of the Council of Debrecen (1966–1989).
Robert M. Blizzard, 94, American endocrinologist.
Barney Coombs, 81, British religious leader.
Manos Eleutheriou, 80, Greek poet, lyricist and writer, heart attack.
Ikramullah Gandapur, Pakistani politician, Khyber Pakhtunkhwa Minister for Agriculture (2014–2018), bombing.
Frank Havens, 93, American sprint canoeist, Olympic champion (1952).
Raymond Hunthausen, 96, American Roman Catholic prelate, Bishop of Helena (1962–1975) and Archbishop of Seattle (1975–1991).
June Jacobs, 88, British peace activist, stroke.
Donald Kaul, 83, American journalist (The Des Moines Register), co-founder of RAGBRAI, prostate cancer.
Brian Kellow, 59, American magazine editor (Opera News) and biographer, brain cancer.
Fatima Abdel Mahmoud, 73, Sudanese politician.
Hatidža Mehmedović, 64, Bosnian human rights activist, founder and leader of the Mothers of Srebrenica, breast cancer.
Basabi Nandi, 82, Indian actress (Bon Palashir Padabali), heart attack.
Rene Portland, 65, American college basketball coach (Penn State Lady Lions), cancer.
Bernardo Ribas Carli, 32, Brazilian politician, member of Legislative Assembly of Paraná (since 2011), plane accident.
Egidius Schiffer, 62, German serial killer, electrocution. (body discovered on this date)
Clemmie Spangler, 86, American banker, natural resource executive (National Gypsum) and academic administrator, President of the UNC (1986–1997).
Tony Sparano, 56, American football coach (Dallas Cowboys, Oakland Raiders, Miami Dolphins), arteriosclerotic heart disease.
Tor Erling Staff, 85, Norwegian lawyer.

23
Maryon Pittman Allen, 92, American journalist and politician, U.S. Senator from Alabama (1978).
Vitaliy Balytskyi, 39, Ukrainian football player and manager.
Lucy Birley, 58, British model (Robert Mapplethorpe) and socialite, apparent suicide by gunshot.
Julia Borisenko, 28, Belarusian footballer (Zvezda-BGU Minsk, Ryazan, national team), drowned.
George Brown, 86, American Olympic long jumper (1952).
Helen Burns, 101, English actress.
Choi In-hun, 82, South Korean writer, colorectal cancer.
Tony Cline, 69, American football player (Oakland Raiders, San Francisco 49ers, Miami Hurricanes).
Jimmy Copeland, 76, Scottish footballer (Clyde, Kilmarnock).
Howard Felsher, 90, American game show producer (Family Feud, Password, Tic-Tac-Dough).
Harry Gulkin, 90, Canadian film producer (Lies My Father Told Me, Two Solitudes, Bayo), pneumonia.
Elbert Howard, 80, American civil rights activist, co-founder of the Black Panther Party.
Stephen Juan, 69, American anthropologist and author.
Vladimir Komarov, 69, Russian Olympic speed skater (1972) and sports official.
Mary Jane McCaffree, 106, American secretary, White House Social Secretary (1955–1961).
Paul Madeley, 73, English footballer (Leeds United, national team), Parkinson's disease.
Duke Carl Gregor of Mecklenburg, 85, German royal and art historian.
Pierre Pican, 83, French Roman Catholic prelate, Bishop of Bayeux (1988–2010).
Roh Hoe-chan, 61, South Korean politician, member of the National Assembly (2004–2008, 2012–2013, since 2016), suicide by jumping.
Khalid Salleh, 70, Malaysian actor, respiratory failure.
Oksana Shachko, 31, Ukrainian artist and human rights activist, co-founder of Femen, suspected suicide.
Chrysa Spiliotis, 62, Greek actress and playwright, wildfire.
Jacob Tanzer, 83, American attorney, Associate Justice of the Oregon Supreme Court (1980–1982).
Giuseppe Tonutti, 93, Italian politician, Senator (1976–1987).
Steven Béla Várdy, 83, Hungarian historian.
Elliot Vesell, 84, American pharmacologist.

24
Masanao Aoki, 87, Japanese engineer and economist.
Vincenzo Silvano Casulli, 73, Italian astronomer, discoverer of 194 minor planets and asteroids.
Tony Cloninger, 77, American baseball player (Atlanta Braves, Cincinnati Reds) and coach (New York Yankees).
Fred Donaldson, 81, English footballer (Port Vale, Exeter City and Chester).
Mary Ellis, 101, British WWII era transport pilot (RAF, ATA).
Vaughn Eshelman, 49, American baseball player (Boston Red Sox), liver disease.
Florindo Fabrizio, 73, American politician, member of the Pennsylvania House of Representatives (since 2003), cancer.
Corinne Gallant, 96, Canadian feminist philosopher.
Walter Hirrlinger, 92, German politician.
Isidor Levin, 98, Latvian folklorist.
Jack P. Lewis, 99, American Biblical scholar.
J. D. Lynch, 70, American politician, President pro tempore of the Montana Senate (1991-1994)
John Murray, 83, English cricketer (Middlesex, national team).
Reginald Pickup, 88, English footballer (Stoke City F.C.).
Delroy Scott, 71, Jamaican footballer (Atlanta Chiefs).
Patrick Troy, 82, Australian town planner and academic.
Murray Watson Jr., 86, American politician, member of the Texas Senate (1963–1973) and House of Representatives (1957–1963).
Phail Wynn, 70, American educator and banker (SunTrust Banks), president of Durham Tech (1980–2007).

25
Judith Appelbaum, 78, American editor, consultant and author, ovarian cancer.
Vakhtang Balavadze, 90, Georgian freestyle wrestler, Olympic bronze medallist (1956), world champion (1954, 1957).
Bob Brady, 86, Canadian football player (BC Lions, Toronto Argonauts).
Nick Browne-Wilkinson, Baron Browne-Wilkinson, 88, British judge, Senior Lord of Appeal in Ordinary (1998–2000).
Kalparanjan Chakma, 96, Bangladeshi politician.
Frank Clarke, 84, American football player (Cleveland Browns, Dallas Cowboys) and sportscaster (CBS).
Shelly Cohen, 84, American musician (The Tonight Show Starring Johnny Carson), pneumonia.
Jimmy Collins, 80, Scottish footballer (Brighton & Hove Albion, Tottenham Hotspur).
Guy Fallot, 91, French cellist.
Luis Gneiting, 50, Paraguayan politician, Governor of Itapúa (2013–2017) and Minister of Agriculture and Livestock (since 2018), plane crash.
Andrew Hopper, 69, British lawyer.
Richard Jarecki, 86, German-born American physician and gambler, pneumonia.
Carolyn Jones, 77, British actress (Crossroads).
Delwin Jones, 94, American politician, member of the Texas House of Representatives (1964–1972, 1989–2011).
Rick Littlewood, 77, New Zealand Olympic judoka (1972).
Sergio Marchionne, 66, Italian-Canadian automotive executive (Fiat Chrysler Automobiles, Ferrari, Maserati), heart attack.
Guy Molinari, 89, American politician, member of the U.S. House of Representatives for New York's 14th (1983–1989) and 17th districts (1981–1983) and State Assembly (1975–1980).
Braham Murray, 75, English theatre director (Manchester Royal Exchange).
Ricardo C. Puno, 95, Filipino lawyer and politician, Minister of Justice (1979–1984).
Glen Roven, 60, American composer, conductor and producer.
Clara Sereni, 71, Italian author.
Robert Ellis Smith, 77, American attorney, heart attack.
Ellie Soutter, 18, British snowboarder (Team GB), suicide by hanging.
György Szepesi, 96, Hungarian radio sportscaster and football executive, Executive Committee Chairman of FIFA (1982–1994).
Rudi Thomaes, 65, Belgian businessman, CEO of the Federation of Belgian Enterprises.
Líber Vespa, 46, Uruguayan football player (Rosario Central, national team) and coach (C.A. Cerro), aneurysm.
Giancarlo Vitali, 88, Italian painter and engraver.
Patrick Williams, 79, American composer (The Mary Tyler Moore Show, Breaking Away, Cry-Baby), cancer.

26
Alfredo del Águila, 83, Mexican footballer (national team, Deportivo Toluca F.C., Club América).
Simegnew Bekele, 53, Ethiopian engineer and public administrator, shot.
Achille Boothman, 79, Irish hurler.
Willie Brown, 76, American football player (Philadelphia Eagles, Los Angeles Rams, USC Trojans) and coach, cancer.
Michel Butel, 77, French journalist.
María Concepción César, 91, Argentine actress (Rosaura at 10 O'Clock, Savage Pampas), singer and dancer.
Stanley Cole, 72, American water polo player, Olympic bronze medallist (1972).
Adem Demaçi, 82, Kosovar political activist, President of Parliamentary Party of Kosovo (1996–1998).
Walter Fisher, 87, American communication theorist, Alzheimer's disease.
Bradley S. Greenberg, 83, American communication theorist, cancer.
Giorgos Katsibardis, 79, Greek attorney, athlete and politician, founding member of PASOK and MP (1977–2000), drowned.
John Kline, 87, American basketball player (Harlem Globetrotters).
Aloyzas Kveinys, 56, Lithuanian chess grandmaster, heart attack.
Robert Martin, 99, American fighter pilot (Tuskegee Airmen), pneumonia.
Berit Nøkleby, 78, Norwegian historian.
Orlando Ramírez, 75, Chilean footballer (Universidad Católica, Palestino, national team).
Sha Yexin, 79, Chinese playwright.
Mostafa Rashidi Suja, 68, Bangladeshi politician, MP for Khulna (1991–2006), kidney disease.
Anne Vermeer, 101, Dutch politician, Member of the House of Representatives (1956–1963), Senator (1966–1987), Mayor of Amersfoort (1976–1982).
Galen Wahlmeier, 84, American-born Canadian football player (Saskatchewan Roughriders) and politician, Mayor of Estevan.
Alastair Yates, 66, British news anchor (BBC News, Sky News, About Anglia).
Japanese convicted murderers from the Aum Shinrikyo cult, executed by hanging.
Kenichi Hirose, 54.
Kazuaki Okazaki, 57.

27
Alan Bennion, 88, British actor (Doctor Who, Z Cars).
T. H. P. Chentharasseri, 89, Indian historian.
George Cunningham, 87, British politician, MP (1970–1983).
Michael P. DeLong, 73, American Marine Corps lieutenant general, heart attack.
Marco Aurelio Denegri, 80, Peruvian linguist, sexologist and television host, pulmonary fibrosis.
Abubakar Habu Hashidu, 74, Nigerian politician, Governor of Gombe State (1999–2003).
Bernard Hepton, 92, British actor (Colditz, I, Claudius, Secret Army).
Leo E. Litwak, 94, American writer.
Mateja Matejić, 94, Yugoslavian-born American writer.
Bongani Mayosi, 51, South African cardiology professor (University of Cape Town), Order of Mapungubwe recipient (2009), suicide.
Algimantas Nasvytis, 90, Lithuanian architect.
Ousha the Poet, 98, Emirati poet.
Vitaly Shentalinsky, 78, Russian writer.
Yuri Shundrov, 62, Russian-Ukrainian ice hockey player (Sokil Kiev) and goaltending coach.
Song Yuquan, 85, Chinese materials scientist, academician of the Chinese Academy of Sciences.
Enrique Verástegui, 68, Peruvian poet, physicist and philosopher, heart attack.
Vladimir Voinovich, 85, Russian writer.
Geoff Whitty, 71, British educator (Institute of Education).

28
Guillermo Bredeston, 84, Argentine actor (Pobres habrá siempre, The Dragonfly Is Not an Insect, Deliciously Amoral), stroke.
John C. Buechner, 82, American university administrator and politician, member of the Colorado House of Representatives (1973–1975), President of University of Colorado (1995–2000).
Christopher Gibbs, 79, British antiques dealer.
Wanny van Gils, 59, Dutch footballer (Willem II, NAC Breda, K. Beringen F.C.).
Olga Jackowska, 67, Polish rock singer (Maanam), ovarian cancer.
Kalia Kulothungan, 40, Indian footballer (East Bengal, Bhawanipore), traffic collision.
Bruce Lietzke, 67, American professional golfer, glioblastoma.
Max Ritchie, 83, Australian footballer (North Melbourne).
Kanagaratnam Shanmugaratnam, 97, Singaporean pathologist.
Fernando Tirapu, 66, Spanish footballer (Athletic Bilbao, Osasuna, Valencia).
Paul Walfish, 83, Canadian endocrinologist, blood cancer.

29
Hans Kristian Amundsen, 58, Norwegian politician and newspaper editor (Nordlys), State Secretary in the Ministry of Fisheries and Coastal Affairs (since 2011).
Alex Boyle, 88, Australian footballer (Carlton).
Brickhouse Brown, 57, American professional wrestler (SCW, WCWA, USWA), prostate cancer.
Umberto Calzolari, 80, Italian baseball player (Fortitudo Baseball Bologna, national team).
Chow Yei-ching, 82, Hong Kong holding company executive, liver cancer.
Ramapada Chowdhury, 95, Indian novelist and short story writer.
Brian Christopher, 46, American professional wrestler (WWF, TNA, USWA), suicide by hanging.
Michael Doman, 57, South African cricketer, complications from diabetes.
Oliver Dragojević, 70, Croatian singer, lung cancer.
Abbas Duzduzani, 76, Iranian politician, Chairman of City Council of Tehran (1999), MP (1984–1992), Minister of Culture (1980–1981).
Yaakov Elman, 74, American Judaic scholar.
Anba Epiphanius, 64, Egyptian Coptic prelate, Abbot of Monastery of Saint Macarius the Great (since 2013).
Graham Finlay, 82, New Zealand Olympic boxer (1956).
John Goodwin, 97, British theatre publicist, writer and editor.
Arsene James, 73, Saint Lucian politician, Minister of Education and Culture (2006–2011).
Peter P. Klassen, 92, Soviet-born Paraguayan writer.
Johnny Lewis, 78, American baseball player (New York Mets) and coach (St. Louis Cardinals).
Lin Xiangdi, 84, Chinese optoelectronic engineer, President of Southwest University of Science and Technology (2000–2004).
Ma Ju-feng, 63, Taiwanese actor (The Spirit of Love, Unique Flavor, Feng Shui Family), stroke.
Sam Mehran, 31, American musician (Test Icicles), suicide.
Fiachra Ó Ceallaigh, 84, Irish Roman Catholic prelate, Auxiliary Bishop of Dublin (1994–2009).
António José Rafael, 92, Portuguese Roman Catholic prelate, Bishop of Bragança-Miranda (1979–2001).
Vibeke Skofterud, 38, Norwegian cross-country skier, Olympic champion (2010), jetskiing accident.
Tomasz Stańko, 76, Polish jazz trumpeter and composer, pneumonia as a complication of lung cancer.
Ian Stanley, 69, Australian golfer, cancer.
Nikolai Volkoff, 70, Yugoslav-born American Hall of Fame professional wrestler (WWF).
Bryan Wagner, 75, American politician, member of the New Orleans City Council (1980–1986).

30
Ken Berkeley, 88, Australian Olympic sailor (1972).
Ron Dellums, 82, American politician, member of the U.S. House of Representatives from California's 7th, 8th and 9th districts (1971–1998), Mayor of Oakland (2007–2011), prostate cancer.
Andreas Kappes, 52, German Olympic cyclist (1984), anaphylactic shock.
Khayyam Mirzazade, 82, Azerbaijani composer and academic.
Carmen Guerrero Nakpil, 96, Filipino author and historian, Chair of the National Historical Commission (1968–1971), pneumonia.
John Sankaramangalam, 84, Indian film director (Janmabhoomi).
Michael A. Sheehan, 63, American author and government official, Coordinator for Counterterrorism (1999–2000), multiple myeloma.
Robert Thunell, 67, American biogeochemist and oceanographer.
Finn Tveter, 70, Norwegian jurist and rower, Olympic silver medalist (1976).
Zhou Yaohe, 91, Chinese scientist.

31
Walid al-Kubaisi, 60, Iraqi-born Norwegian writer.
Rafael Amador, 58, Mexican football player (Pumas UNAM, national team) and coach (Pumas UNAM).
Yoshio Anabuki, 85, Japanese baseball player and manager (Nankai Hawks), sepsis.
Hélio Bicudo, 96, Brazilian politician, Deputy (1991–1999), Vice Mayor of São Paulo (2001–2005), stroke.
Tony Bullimore, 79, British sailor and nightclub owner, stomach cancer.
George Cowgill, 89, American anthropologist and archaeologist. 
Sir Alex Fergusson, 69, British politician, Presiding Officer of the Scottish Parliament (2007–2011).
Michael Krop, 88, American school board member (Miami-Dade County Public Schools), heart disease.
Jose Apolinario Lozada Jr., 67, Filipino diplomat and politician, member of the House of Representatives (1998–2004), brain hemorrhage.
Jovito Plameras Jr., 83, Filipino politician, Governor of Antique (1985–1998) and member of the House of Representatives (1998–2001).
Daryl Robertson, 82, American baseball player (Chicago Cubs).
Isamu Shibayama, 88, Peruvian-born American civil rights activist.
Bassano Staffieri, 86, Italian Roman Catholic prelate, Bishop of Carpi (1989–1999) and La Spezia-Sarzana-Brugnato (1999–2008).
Christopher Stensaker, 73, Norwegian politician, member of Storting (1997–2005).
Su Hongxi, 103, Chinese surgeon.
Teoh Seng Khoon, 99, Malaysian badminton player.
Julia Weertman, 92, American materials scientist.
Damian Worrad, 43, English cricketer.
Beatrice Wright, 100, American psychologist.
Manfred Wuttich, 77, German footballer (Eintracht Braunschweig, VfL Wolfsburg), Parkinson's disease.

References

2018-07
 07